The 1977 Auburn Tigers football team achieved an overall record of 5–6 under second-year head coach Doug Barfield and 4–2 in the SEC.  However, due to sanctions imposed against Mississippi state, the loss that year was vacated and Auburn's record officially improved to 6–5 (5–1).

Four players were named to the All-SEC first team for 1977: Lynn Johnson (OG), James McKinney (DB), Jorge Portela (SP), and Freddie Smith (LB).

Schedule

Personnel

References

Auburn
Auburn Tigers football seasons
Auburn Tigers football